The Next Hundred Years is a 1994 album by Ted Hawkins.  It was the last album released during Hawkins's lifetime. The Washington Post called it one of 1994's best albums.

Critical reception
AllMusic gave the album 3.5 stars (out of 5), with reviewer Bill Dahl calling it "a far weaker outing than what came before, largely due to a plodding band unwisely inserted behind Hawkins that tends to distract rather than enhance his impassioned vocals and rich acoustic guitar strumming." The Los Angeles Times called The Next Hundred Years "an album of strange and wonderful beauty."

Track listing
All tracks composed by Ted Hawkins; except where indicated
"Strange Conversation"
"Big Things"
"There Stands the Glass" (Russ Hall, Mary Jean Shurtz, Michael Pierce)
"Biloxi" (Jesse Winchester)
"Groovy Little Things"
"The Good and the Bad"
"Afraid"
"Green-Eyed Girl"
"Ladder Of Success"
"Long as I Can See the Light" (John Fogerty)

Personnel
Ted Hawkins – guitar, vocals

Additional musicians
Chris Bruce – guitar
Tony Berg – keyboards, guitar
Jim Keltner – drums, percussion
Greg Leisz – steel guitar
Pat Mastelotto – drums, percussion
Kevin McCormick – bass guitar
Bill Payne – keyboards
John Pierce – bass guitar
Guy Pratt – bass guitar
Martin Tillman – cello
Patrick Warren – keyboards
Greg Wells – drums, percussion

Technical personnel
Tony Berg – production
Bob Ludwig – mastering at Gateway Mastering, Portland, Maine, United States
Pat McCarthy – mixing
John Paterno – recording
Susan Rogers – recording

Artwork
Jeff Sedlik – photography
Robin Sloane – creative direction
Janet Wolsborn – art direction

Chart positions

References

1994 albums
Geffen Records albums
Ted Hawkins albums
Albums produced by Tony Berg